, known as simply Pretty Cure outside Japan, is a Japanese anime television series produced by Toei Animation and aired on ANN for 96 episodes. It is the first installment in the Pretty Cure metaseries created by Izumi Todo.

The first season, directed by Daisuke Nishio, aired between February 1, 2004 and January 30, 2005, in the same timeslot as Izumi Todo's previous work Ashita no Nadja. It received an adapted English-dubbed version, which aired in Canada between March 2009 and July 2010.

A second season, or simply Max Heart, aired in Japan between February 6, 2005, and January 29, 2006. It was then succeeded by Futari wa Pretty Cure Splash Star in its timeslot. Two Max Heart movies were released on April 16, 2005, and December 10, 2005, respectively. The series' main motif is yin and yang.

Plot
Futari wa Pretty Cure revolves around two girls, Nagisa Misumi and Honoka Yukishiro, who encounter the Garden of Light's Mipple and Mepple, who give them the power to transform into the emissaries of light; Cure Black and Cure White, to fight against the forces of the Dark Zone: a dimension of evil that has encroached on the Garden of Light and is now about to do the same to the Garden of Rainbows, Earth. The Cures search for the Prism Stones, placing them in a heart-shaped device known as the Prism Hopish, protected by the Guardian, Wisdom. Once they have discovered all the Prism Stones, its power takes them to the Garden of Light and repairs most of the damage done by the Dark Zone. Later in the series, Porun, the Prince of the Garden of Light, grants the Pretty Cure duo use of their Rainbow Bracelets as they defeat the Dark King.

In Max Heart, Nagisa and Honoka meet the mysterious Hikari Kujou, who is soon revealed to be the "Life" of the Queen, whose powers were scattered into the form of twelve "Heartiels" following her battle with the Dark King. Meanwhile, remnants of the Dark Zone are protecting a mysterious boy, who is suspected of being the "Life" of the Dark King. Joined by Hikari, who gains the power to become Shiny Luminous, the Pretty Cures once again fight against the Dark Zone in order to retrieve the Heartiels and restore the Queen.

Characters
Where appropriate, names on the left are from the original Japanese version, whilst names on the right without Japanese text are from both the Canadian and Singaporean English dubs. Character descriptions pertain to the Japanese version of the show.

Pretty Cures List

Futari wa Pretty Cures
 / 

Main character of this work. Nagisa is a 14/15-year-old student in the second year (third year in season 2) of Private Verone Academy Sakura Class. The ace of the school lacrosse team, she is strong-hearted, but also incredibly lazy, barely ever doing her homework. She is also a food lover, her favorite dish being the takoyaki from Akane's stand. Although generally courageous, she frequently becomes quite flustered when near Shogo, on whom she has a crush. She is often known for her catchphrase . As Cure Black, she is strong and passionate. Her theme colors are black and pink.

 / 

Another main character of this work. A 14/15-year-old quiet girl who is Nagisa's classmate in both second and third year of her middle school. She lives with her grandmother Sanae and her dog Chuutaro, as her parents are constantly working overseas. She is quite intelligent and extremely knowledgeable, and is thus nicknamed 'The Queen of Knowledge'. She is in fact a member of the school's science club, where she is looked up to by the others. Honoka has not had many friends, but the few she has seem to be really close to her, and she has come to appreciate Nagisa's friendship. Her theme colors are white and light blue.

Additional Members
 / 

A shy blonde 13-year-old girl who appears only in Max Heart. She is "Life of the Queen" in human form after the Queen got split apart following her last encounter with the Dark King. Going under the guise of Akane's cousin and working at her takoyaki stand, Hikari enrolls into Private Verone Academy as a freshman and becomes friends with Nagisa and Honoka. She later gains the ability from Pollun to transform into Shiny Luminous, gaining further power from Lulun. Although she does not have much strength or skill in fighting, she can use her abilities to hamper opponents and enhance Black and White's attacks. Her theme colors are pink and yellow.

The Garden of Light

Mepple is the chosen protector of the Prince of Hope who allows Nagisa to transform into Cure Black. He is noticeably selfish, as he is somewhat possessive of Mipple and becomes jealous when Pollun takes her attention away from him. Despite residing with Nagisa, he frequently gets into a fight with her, often begging her to feed him, even occasionally poking fun at her. He ends his sentences with "mepo". Mepple can only stay in his true form for a short time before growing tired, so he generally takes on an energy-saving form resembling a cellphone.

Mipple is the Princess of Hope from the Garden of Light who resides predominantly with Honoka and gives her the ability to transform into Cure White. She, like Honoka, is generally more reserved than her male counterpart. She ends her sentences with "mipo". Although it is hinted that Mepple has feelings for her, Mipple is always sticking up for Pollun, causing problems between her and Mepple whenever Mepple comes on the scene. Like Mepple, Mipple usually stays in a cellphone-like case for the same reason as Mepple.

Pollun is the Prince of the Garden of Light. He is sent to Earth once all the Prism Stones have been retrieved by the Cures. The Queen gives a cryptic statement about his powers aiding Pretty Cure. Later, when Wisdom is in trouble, Wisdom places the power of the Rainbow Stones into Pollun without his knowledge. This gives him the ability to remain in his regular form as well as the ability to communicate with various people from the Garden of Light. When communicating with members of the Garden of Light, he turns into what looks like a gaming console and everyone can hear what is said and communicate openly. He also grants Pretty Cure the power of light which gives them their Rainbow Bracelets. He tends to be extremely selfish and think only of himself. He is quite childish and has a lot of energy. He can get a little annoying at times and definitely annoys Mepple when he wants to be alone with Mipple. Conversely, he himself is bothered whenever Lulun wants to play with him. He lives predominantly with Nagisa in Pretty Cure and with Hikari in Max Heart. He enjoys getting between Mipple and Mepple.

The Princess of Light who can connect the future who appears in Max Heart. She thinks of Pollun as her older brother and always annoys him. Lulun can give the Heartiel Brooch to Luminous.

She appears as a huge CGI woman sitting on a throne, though she is easily overtowered by the Dark King. She carries a heart-shaped item of some sort. She has stated that she is impressed with the courage of Pretty Cure and aids them when she can. She seems to always be closing her eyes. During Max Heart, the Queen's is split apart into Hikari and the twelve Heartiels.

Wisdom, often referred to as simply  is the keeper of Prism Stones, often residing on top of the Prism Hopish. His expressions often range from very sleepy to overly spooked.

A wise sage who resides in the Garden of Light. Despite his wisdom, he often keeps forgetting Nagisa and Honoka's names and referring to them as the Pretty Cura.

The Heartiels are twelve fairies who are the embodiment of the Queen's Will. The Pretty Cure duo gather the Heartiels and place them in the Queen Chairect, an item that represent the Queen's Heart, in hopes of making Queen whole again. When Pretty Cure wants one of the Heartiels to come out of the Queen Chairect and help them, Seekun will turn the knob around to let out one of the Heartiels.
 
The first of the Heartiels discovered, representing the Queen's sense of adventure and discovery. She asks a lot of questions and seems relatively naive about the world. When the girls need the help of another Heartiel, it is Seekun's job to call the Heartiel out of the Queen Chairect. She is the last Heartiel to enter the chairect. Her symbol in the chairect is the telescope. She seems to prefer Nagisa, as she enjoys spending time with her more than Honoka.
 
Passion can sometimes be seen flying with a white dove in some episodes. His symbol in the chairect is the torch. His Pigeon always lands on Nagisa's head.
 
 First appeared in episode 9, but met the Pretty Cure in episode 10. She is mostly seen with a treasure box with her. Her symbol in the chairect is the treasure chest.
 
 Her symbol in the chairect is the snowflake.
 
 Inteligen is the only Heartiel who has been entrusted with the Book of Wisdom. In episode 22, she helped Pretty Cure find a solution to oppose the power of Baldez with the help of the Book of Wisdom. At first, she did not like Nagisa, but she soon developed a liking for Nagisa, after seeing her pure heart. Her symbol in the chairect is the book.
 
 Her symbol in the chairect is the mirror.
 
 
First seen at the end of episode 31.
 
 
 Her symbol in the chairect is the bell.
 
 
His symbol in the chairect is the pocket watch.

Dark Zone

The imprisoned ruler of the Dark Zone, somewhat humanoid in form that appears to come out of the ground. He is very tall and muscular with red eyes and extremely long arms. He does not appear to wear clothing. He wants to acquire the Prism Stones to prevent the "power to consume all things" from eventually destroying his own body, and to become immortal—he believes that it is the fate of all things to be consumed by the darkness. Like the Queen of the Garden of Light, the Dark King is animated by CGI.

The Zakenna are large purple monsters that are summoned by servants of the Dark Zone. These monsters combine with objects or living things to oppose the Pretty Cure. When they are defeated by a purifying move, they burst into numerous smal star-shaped monsters called , who scurry off apologising.

Dark Five
The Dark King's first wave of servants.

The weakest of the Dark Five. Pisard is often thought to resemble a member of KISS, but when one looks closely, his look is closer to that of a male Kabuki actor in "keshō" ("make up"), having long hair and a painted face.

The strongman of the Dark Five, large and muscular with a moai-shaped head. He relies on his brawn rather than his brain. Easily having the highest fortitude of the group, Gekidrago can take a direct, unprotected hit from a Marble Screw (or Twister in the English Dub) and only be knocked out for a few minutes. He often ends his sentences with "-Muka".

The only female of the Dark Five. Instead of making a big show of calling on Zakenna like Pisard and Gekidorago, she snaps her fingers and is much more discreet about it. She often takes on a human appearance to gain the trust of the girls before attacking. In her true form, she resembles a vampire: She is pale, dresses in black tinted with red, wears a cape and has fangs, dark-rimmed yellow and red eyes and long red hair.

The youngest of the Dark Five, Poisonny's younger brother, he comes to the Garden of Rainbows (Earth) in order to spy on Nagisa and Honoka, infiltrating their school as a freshman  and ends up becoming friends with them, developing a fondness and love for Honoka after she shows kindness to him. Later on he starts to have emotions and feelings for Honoka while trying to understand human emotions, resulting with him unable to fight the Pretty Cure duo. This act results with him sent back to the Dark Zone, but not before willingly giving a Prism Stone to the Pretty Cure duo. After the Dark King is destroyed, Kiriya returns as a normal human and lives an equally normal life.

The leader and most powerful of the five and the Dark King's right-hand man. He can block the Marble Screw (or Twister in the English Dub) with just his abilities, as well as many other attacks, but his fortitude isn't as high as Gekidrago, as a direct hit will still hurt him. He first appeared on Earth, but did not start seriously fighting the girls until after Kiriya is sent back to the Dark Zone. He is defeated in episode 24 but made a brief comeback in episode 25 in which he battles Pretty Cure and takes them to the Dark Zone in a far more monstrous (and powerful) form. He is large, pale and bald with pointed ears and dark-rimmed eyes that resemble those of Kiriya. He wears a white robe and carries a purple sphere.

Three Seeds of Darkness
When the Dark Five are defeated, new enemies appear: the Three Seeds of Darkness. The butlers serve as comic relief, as they are unintelligent and tend to fight and bicker a lot. However, unlike other Zakenna, they speak human language, only using "-zakenna" to end their sentences. The taller Zakenna is laid back and somewhat clumsy, while the shorter Zakenna is quick to anger.

The de facto leader of the trio. His human alias is Genbu Yuuki (Dr. Encastle in the English version). He's a plotter and a sadist. He is first seen in the series impersonating a doctor. He is able to blend in by making people think he is someone else. Due to his own ego, it's always someone of a high position, like head doctor or principal.

The only female of the trio. Her human alias is Shoko Koyama (Sheila in the English version). She starts out as a pretty red head, but then transforms and her hair stands straight back, then bounces into six curls. When in human form, she has a tendency to mumble things twice, then suddenly she will scream out without warning, shocking everyone. She is far more confident in her dark form, though.

The tall young man of the trio. The muscle of the group, Juna is quite stoic and his expression seldom changes. His human alias is Ryuichiro Kakuzawa (Edgedale in the English version), who is made as his original form in the English version.

The Zakenna butlers are Zakenna who are just smart enough to speak, and they look after the mansion resided by The Three Seeds and the Four Guardians.

Four Guardians
The Four Guardians are what remains of the Dark Zone, serving as the protectors of the "Life" of the Evil King whom they go to lengths to revive.

The strongest and leader of the Four Guardians. He can repel the Marble Screw, Luminous Heartiel Action and Extreme Luminario attacks. Moreover, his true form is the spirit of the Dark King.

The apparent second-in-command. He often assumes the role of the "leader" of the group whenever Baldez isn't around. He often bickers with Uraganos.

Large and dim-witted. He is clumsy and tends to destroy things by accident due to his size and strength. Uraganos also to never seem to hear people finish their sentences, especially Circulas.

The more serious and only female of the group. She often scolds Uraganos and Circulas when they argue and is more intimidating. She is also the type to never apologize even when she was wrong.

A mysterious boy who is actually the 'Life' of the Dark King. He often plays games with the Butler Zakenna though often seeks fun outside of the mansion. He is seemingly linked to Hikari, as various incidents occur when the two come face to face. At the end of the series, the boy becomes Hikari's younger brother, .

Cures' families 

Takashi is Nagisa and Ryouta's father, and husband of Rie.

Rie is Takashi's wife, and the mother of Nagisa and Ryouta. Although she sometimes can get easily angry with nagisa in which their relationship tends to be very estranged at times.she often scolds her because of her shenanigans like refusing to do some chores because pf her lazy attitude, doing bad and poorly at school or for picking and fighthing with her younger brother ryouta. But despite her occasional anger towards her daughther rie still deeply cares about nagisa very much in which not only she deeply cares about her but she also deeply cares and loves her family so much and she would anything for them. She also seem to be the only one who can just breaks nagisa and ryouta's constant arguments

Nagisa's younger brother whom he formely shared a sibling rivalry with her ,  has a habit of pulling pranks on her. A running gag has him put in a headlock by Nagisa in retaliation to shut him up.
Much like mepple he and nagisa tends to bickers with each other but deep down they still deeply care and loves with one another despite their frequent quarrels. Initially nagisa does not shown gets along with him at first during the first season because of his irritating attitude ( which to the point of her giving him the "cobra twist " several times throughout in both seasons ) but however as the season progresses their relationship starts to improve as nagisa and ryouta becomes having a better sibling relationship but like mepple they both never stop bicker and argues with each other.

Honoka's grandmother who takes care of her whilst her parents work overseas. She appears to know a lot about the Pretty Cure, as she found Mipple at a young age, though she keeps this a secret from Honoka and Nagisa.

Honoka's father, and Aya's husband.

Honoka's mother, and Taro's wife.

Honoka's dog.

Verone Academy 

The teacher of Verone Academy. She is romantic and quiet  over the season.

The principal of Verone Academy. He has a big-hearted personality and is a bit clumsy.

The vice-principal of Verone Academy.

The math teacher of Verone Academy.

Classmates 

Often nicknamed FujiP (or Fergie) by his friends, Shougo is a childhood friend of Honoka on whom Nagisa has a crush. He is a hardworking player on his soccer team and often finds comfort in Nagisa's advice. Since he has no past of his life, he may be oriented from another world.

Rina is one of Nagisa's best friends, also a member of the lacrosse team. She is always seen with Shiho.

Shiho is Nagisa's other best friend and a member of the lacrosse team. She is always seen with Rina.

Yuriko is Honoka's friend, and also a member of the science club.

Mayu is an artist inspired by Mario Piccasseci.

Yumiko is the captain of the lacrosse team.

Yuka is a member of the lacrosse team.

 and 

Natsuko and Kyoko are a pair of friends who worship the Pretty Cure duo to the point of wearing their costumes.

Seiko is a 13-year-old classmate. The favorite game is the piano.

Member of the Verone Junior Boys' Institute's soccer team.

Yui is the love of FujiP.

Chiaki is a classmate. She is part of the choir who directs and plays the piano.

Member of the Verone Junior Boys' Institute's soccer team.

 and 

Two classmates of Hikari.

 and 

Members of the lacrosse team.

Other characters 

Akane is the previous captain of the school lacrosse team who now runs her own takoyaki stand, which Nagisa frequently visits. In Max Heart, she serves as Hikari's guardian under the assumption that she is her cousin, possibly due to the manipulation of the Queen.

Media

Anime

The original Futari wa Pretty Cure anime aired in Japan between February 1, 2004, and January 30, 2005. The follow up series, Max Heart, aired in Japan between February 6, 2005, and January 29, 2006.
The anime later re-aired on TV Asahi's cable channel, TeleAsa Channel 1, in March 2013.

Films

Two animated films based on the Max Heart series were released. The first, was released on April 16, 2005. The second movie, was released December 10, 2005. The heroines also appear in all Pretty Cure All Stars movies, which ran between 2009 and 2016. Another crossover film, Hugtto! PreCure ♡ Futari wa Pretty Cure, was released on October 27, 2018, celebrating the franchise's 15th anniversary.

Licensed Media and Dubs
On February 24, 2006, 4Kids Entertainment announced broadcasting and distribution rights for Pretty Cure in the United States, though never produced an English version of it. In July 2008, Toei Animation began making episodes available through IGN's Direct2Drive service subtitled into English, and have also started making those same episodes available for free internet streaming on Crunchyroll. The subtitles were produced by "Nippon Golden Network", a Hawaii-based cable network that broadcasts Asian programming (mostly from Japan), and featured low-quality video and audio. In April 2009, Funimation used to license the English-subtitled version of the series for online distribution on the company's website. This subtitled version was updated on Crunchyroll and VRV on March 25, 2021, with improved video and audio quality.

An English-dubbed version was produced by Toei and Ocean Productions using their Blue Water studio in Calgary, Alberta which aired on Canada's YTV channel from March 6, 2009, to July 31, 2010. Although uncut in content, the English dub makes several changes to character names, cultural references and theme music, though mostly retains the original version's main soundtrack. This dub also aired in the United Kingdom on the Pop Girl digital channel from September 6, 2010.

This anime also aired, in Indonesian-dubbed version on RCTI, Indosiar (MAX Heart version) and Spacetoon Plus.

A Cantonese dub of the anime aired in TVB stations in Hong Kong, with the theme song sung by Cantonese band duo,  Twins.

Manga
Both the television series and their movies received manga adaptation which were illustrated by Futago Kamikita in Kodansha's Nakayoshi magazine as they aired.

Video games
Four video games based on the two series have been released in Japan by Bandai. An educational video game was released for the Sega Pico in 2004. A puzzle platformer, was released for Game Boy Advance in 2004. A platformer,  was released for Game Boy Advance in 2005. A side-scrolling beat 'em up game,  was also released in 2005 for the Nintendo DS. Nagisa, Honoka and Hikari have also appeared in other Nintendo DS games based on subsequent Pretty Cure series.

Reception
The series' popularity quickly spawned it into a full franchise with many different series. In a TV Asahi opinion poll, Pretty Cure appeared in the 45th position, above other series of the magical girl genre like Cutie Honey (technically not a "magical girl" series in the same sense; see article for details), Cardcaptor Sakura, and Magical Angel Creamy Mami.

References

External links

 Toei Animation's Futari wa Pretty Cure website 
 Toei Animation's Futari wa Pretty Cure: Max Heart website 
 Crunchyroll's Pretty Cure page
 

2004 anime television series debuts
2005 anime television series debuts
2006 Japanese television series endings
2005 anime films
2005 comics endings
2006 comics endings
Pretty Cure
Anime with original screenplays
Funimation
Toei Animation television
TV Asahi original programming
Magical girl anime and manga
Toei Animation films
Odex